Betül Yılmaz (born 31 October 1988 in Ümraniye, Istanbul) is a Turkish handballer playing in left back position. She was educated in physical education and sports at Kocaeli University.

Yılmaz is since 2005 a member of Üsküdar Belediyespor in Istanbul.

In May 2015, she transferred to Zağnos SK from Kastamonu Bld. SK.

Achievements

National
 2006–07 Üsküdar Belediyespor S.K. TWHSL 
 2007–08 Üsküdar Belediyespor S.K. TWHSL 
 2007–08 Üsküdar Belediyespor S.K. TWHC 
 2008–09 Üsküdar Belediyespor S.K. TWHSL 
 2008–09 Üsküdar Belediyespor S.K. TWHC 
 2009–10 Üsküdar Belediyespor S.K. TWHSL 
 2011–12 Üsküdar Belediyespor S.K. TWHSL 
 2012–13 Üsküdar Belediyespor S.K. TWHSL 

Legend:
 TWHSL Turkish Women's Handball Super League.
 TWHC Turkish Women's Handball Cup.

References 

1988 births
People from Ümraniye
Living people
Sportspeople from Istanbul
Turkish female handball players
Kocaeli University alumni
Üsküdar Belediyespor players
Muratpaşa Bld. SK (women's handball) players
Turkey women's national handball players
Zağnos SK (women's handball) players
Mediterranean Games medalists in handball
Mediterranean Games silver medalists for Turkey
Competitors at the 2009 Mediterranean Games
Competitors at the 2018 Mediterranean Games
Competitors at the 2022 Mediterranean Games